James Aitchison may refer to:

 James Aitchison (cricketer) (1920–1994), Scottish first class cricketer
 James H. Aitchison (1908–1994), Canadian academic and politician
 James Edward Tierney Aitchison (1836–1898), Scottish surgeon and botanist